The 2019 Las Vegas Lights FC season was the club's second season, and their second season in the United Soccer League Championship, the second division of American soccer.

Background 

Lights FC finished its inaugural season third-bottom of the Western Conference table, with the fifth worst record in the United Soccer League.  Lights FC were able to score 50 goals during the 2018 season, however the defensive record was poor – conceding 74 goals during the game, third most in the league.  Lights FC were led by Raúl Mendiola and Sammy Ochoa, whom each scored 10 goals for Lights FC over all competitions.  Despite a poor winning record, Lights FC proved to be highly successful off of the field, recording the fifth highest average attendance in the league and the second highest in the Western Conference.

Following the completion of the Light's 2018 campaign, CEO/Owner/General Manager informed manager Isidro Sánchez Macip that he would not be retained for the 2019 season, following his father, Chelís who had resigned less than a month prior.  Three days after announcing Sánchez' sacking, Lights FC introduced former United States national team player Eric Wynalda as Head Coach and Technical Director.  Prior to accepting Lights FC's offer, Wynalda had been an analyst and color commentator for Fox Sports 1 and had previous coaching stints with L.A. Wolves FC, Atlanta Silverbacks, and Cal FC whom he led to a U.S. Open Cup upset of Major League Soccer side Portland Timbers in 2012.

With the Las Vegas's minor league baseball franchise moving to a new ballpark in Summerlin, Light FC became the primary tenant at Cashman Field.

Summary

Preseason 
On December 12, 2018, Lights FC announced two preseason friendlies against MLS sides at Cashman Field in preparations for the 2019 season.  The matches were to be on February 2 against Toronto FC and February 12th against Colorado Rapids.  A final preseason friendly was added to the schedule for March 2 against USL side Orange County SC for March 2.

Lights FC would begin their preseason with a dominating 5–1 victory over Toronto FC, being led by a brace from former Toronto FC draft pick Edwin Rivas and additional goals from Alex Harlley, Irvin Parra, and Bryan Arguez.  In the second preseason friendly, Lights FC and Colorado traded goals through the first and second half, leading to a 2–2 draw between the two clubs.  Lights FC would get goals from Cristhian Hernández and Christian Torres, while the Rapids would receive goals from Dillon Serna and Nicolás Mezquida.  In Lights FC's final preseason friendly, Irvin Parra netted a brace for the club in a 2–1 victory over Orange County.

Club

Competitions

Exhibitions
All times in Pacific Time

USL Championship

Standings

Match results 
On December 19, 2018, the USL announced their 2019 season schedule.

All times in Pacific Time

U.S. Open Cup

As a member of the USL Championship, Las Vegas Lights entered the tournament in the Second Round.

Statistics

Appearances 
Source:

Numbers in parentheses denote appearances as substitute.
Players listed with no appearances have been in the matchday squad, but only as unused substitutes.
Discipline includes league, playoffs, and Open Cup play.
Key to positions: GK – Goalkeeper; DF – Defender; MF – Midfielder; FW – Forward

Clean sheets 
The list is sorted by shirt number when total appearances are equal.

References 

Las Vegas Lights FC
Las Vegas Lights FC
Las Vegas Lights FC seasons
Las Vegas Lights FC